Rémi Mathis (born 20 November 1982) is a French historian and curator. He served as President of Wikimedia France from 2011 to 2014.

Early life
The following year he obtained his degree from the National School of Information Science and Libraries.

In 2010, he married Marie-Alice Mathis, a neuroscientist.

Career

Mathis was in charge of the library of humanities and social science at the Paris Descartes University from 2008 to 2010. Since 2010, he has been a curator for 17th century collections at the Department of Prints and Photographs of the National Library of France. He is the editor of the French academic journal on printmaking . He is a member of the National Committee for French Engraving.

Mathis' research focuses on the 17th century, specifically history of prints and books, Jansenism and diplomatic history. His dissertation, written under the supervision of Lucien Bély and Olivier Poncet, focuses on Simon Arnauld de Pomponne. In 2012, he wrote a book about Pomponne and Robert Arnauld d'Andilly. He has contributed to Papers on French Seventeenth Century Literature. and curated an exhibition on French prints of the 17th c. (Getty-BnF, 2015–2016).

He was made a knight in the order of Arts and Letters and in the Order of Academic Palmes.

Free culture advocacy
Mathis is active in promoting the legalization of freedom of panorama in France. He also advocates against the privatization of the digitization of public-domain works. His work in the culture sector and free culture movement has earned him the nickname "Janus de la transmission," by Le Magazine littéraire.

He was a member and chairperson of Wikimedia France, and served as president from April 2011 to October 2014. In April 2013, the French interior intelligence agency  (DCRI) pressured Mathis into deleting the French language Wikipedia article about the Military radio station of Pierre-sur-Haute, under threat of detention and criminal charges. Later, the article was restored by another Wikipedia contributor based in Switzerland.

He was named Wikipedian of the Year by Jimmy Wales at Wikimania 2013.

See also
 List of Wikipedia people

Bibliography

, 2005, 3, p. 263–276
, thesis. O. Poncet and L. Bely, 2007, 2 vols. (Vol. 1, text, 691 p., Vol. 2, vouchers, 621 p.)
 17th century 2008, 4, p. 725–730.
 Papers on French Seventeenth Century Literature, Vol. XXXVIII, No. 73, 2010 (with G. Louis and F. Poulet).
 Saarbrücken: European University Publishing, 2010, 120 p. .
. 2011.
Le Solitaire et le Ministre : autour de la correspondance Arnauld d'Andilly-Arnauld de Pomponne (1642–1673), Paris, Nolin, 2012 (coll. Univers Port-Royal, 21), 272 p. .
. Proceedings of the conference convened by Hermann Sylvio De Franceschi and Rémi Mathis.  Paris, Society of Friends of Port-Royal, 2012.

References

External links 

 
 Remi Mathis on the French Wikipedia

1982 births
Writers from Besançon
Living people
École Nationale des Chartes alumni
Academic staff of the École Nationale des Chartes
21st-century French historians
French librarians
French male non-fiction writers
Open content activists
French Wikimedians
Wikimédia France
Wikimedians of the Year
Chevaliers of the Ordre des Arts et des Lettres